192nd may refer to:

192nd (Crow's Nest Pass) Battalion, CEF, a unit in the Canadian Expeditionary Force during the First World War
192nd Infantry Brigade (United States), an infantry brigade of the United States Army
192nd Infantry Division (France), a French infantry division during World War II
192nd Military Police Battalion, a National Guard battalion assigned to the Connecticut Army National Guard
192nd Ohio Infantry (or 192nd OVI), an infantry regiment in the Union Army during the American Civil War
192nd Tank Battalion, a federalized US Army National Guard unit activated in November 1940

See also
192 (number)
192, the year 192 (CXCII) of the Julian calendar
192 BC